HSwMS John Ericsson was the lead ship of the  monitors built for the Royal Swedish Navy in the mid-1860s. She was designed under the supervision of the Swedish-born inventor, John Ericsson, and built in Sweden. John Ericsson made one foreign visit to Russia in 1867, but remained in Swedish or Norwegian waters (at the time, Sweden and Norway were united in personal union) for the rest of her career. The ship was reconstructed between 1892 and 1895, but generally remained in reserve. She was mobilized during World War I and sold in 1919 for conversion to a barge.

Design and description
The John Ericsson-class ironclads were designed to meet the need of the Swedish and Norwegian navies for small, shallow-draft armored ships capable of defending their coastal waters. John Ericsson, designer and builder of the Monitor, had been born in Sweden, although he had become an American citizen in 1848, and offered to share his design with the Swedes. In response they sent Lieutenant John Christian d'Ailly to the United States to study monitor design and construction under Ericsson. D'Ailly arrived in July 1862 and toured rolling mills, gun foundries, and visited several different ironclads under construction. He returned to Sweden in 1863 having completed the drawings of a Monitor-type ship under Ericsson's supervision.

John Ericsson was divided into nine main compartments by eight watertight bulkheads. Over time a flying bridge and, later, a full superstructure, was added to each ship between the gun turret and the funnel. Initially her crew numbered 80 officers and men, but this increased to 104 as she was modified with additional weapons.

Propulsion
The John Ericsson-class ships had one twin-cylinder vibrating lever steam engines, designed by Ericsson himself, driving a single four-bladed,  propeller. The ships carried  of coal, enough for six day's steaming.

Armament
The lead ship, John Ericsson, carried a pair of smoothbore  Dahlgren muzzleloaders, donated by John Ericsson, in her turret. The massive shells took 5–6 minutes to reload. These guns were designated as the M/65 by the Swedes.

In 1877 John Ericsson received a pair of 10-barreled  M/75 machine guns designed by Helge Palmcrantz. These guns were replaced during the 1880s by the 4-barreled  M/77 Nordenfeldt gun, which was an enlarged version of Palmcrantz's original design.

John Ericsson was rearmed in 1881 with two  M/76 rifled breech loaders, derived from a French design.

Armor
The gun turret's armor consisted of twelve layers of iron, totalling  in thickness on the first four monitors. The inside of the turret was lined with mattresses to catch splinters. The conning tower was positioned on top of the turret and its sides were ten layers thick. The funnel was protected by six layers of armor with a total thickness of  up to half its height.

Service
John Ericsson had her keel laid down in June 1864 and was launched 17 March 1865. She was commissioned on 13 November 1865. In July 1867 Crown Prince Oscar, later King Oscar II, inspected John Ericsson,
This was the only foreign visit ever made by the ship.

Generally the monitors were kept in reserve for most of the year; only being commissioned for two to four months during the summer and fall. John Ericsson kept up the pattern between 1865 and 1873, but remained in reserve afterward until 1882. She was rearmed with two  M/76 guns in 1881 while her original Dahlgren guns became part of the Ericsson monument at Filipstad. She was reactivated in 1882 and 1883, but only sporadically thereafter. The ship was reconstructed between 1892 and 1895; her gun turret was fixed in place and modified to serve as a barbette for her two new  Bofors M/89 guns. The guns could depress to −5° and elevate to +13°, and they had a firing arc of 290°. Two  Nordenfeldt M/92 quick-firing guns were also added on the superstructure. During the early 1900s the two 25-millimeter machine guns were removed and four, later six, more 57-millimeter guns added to the superstructure. The ship was assigned to the Karlskrona local defense force during 1913–18, and she was sold to the Gotland Cement Company in November 1919. The company converted her to a barge and used her for the next forty years; her final fate is unknown.

Footnotes

References
 
 
 
 

John Ericsson-class monitors of the Swedish Navy
1865 ships
Ships built in Norrköping